John Skilbeck (born 21 July 1958) is an Australian cricketer. He played nine first-class and three List A matches for New South Wales between 1981/82 and 1982/83.

See also
 List of New South Wales representative cricketers

References

External links
 

1958 births
Living people
Australian cricketers
New South Wales cricketers
Cricketers from Sydney